Rhythm of the Night is the fourth studio album by DeBarge, released by Gordy Records on March 14, 1985. It reached #19 on the Billboard 200 and #3 on the R&B Album Chart. The album was also certified Gold by the RIAA.

Background and recording 
DeBarge continued their success streak with their third album, 1983's In a Special Way. They went back into the studio to record what became Rhythm of the Night. Although the group had creative control, the group's managers Tony Jones and Suzanne de Passe elected to have outside producers to helm the project. Producers included Richard Perry, Giorgio Moroder and Jay Graydon with the members of DeBarge on a few songs. Rhythm of the Night contained six new songs, which were recorded specifically for the album. The remaining songs were old material that had been previously released. "Single Heart" originally appeared in the 1983 film D.C. Cab, while "Share My World" originally appeared on their 1981 debut The DeBarges. When asked why the group's contributions were minimal on Rhythm of the Night, El noted that it was largely due to them being busy touring with singer Luther Vandross.

However, in a 2008 episode of TV One's Unsung, the group members revealed that drugs were the real reason behind their limited involvement. Most of the members were drug addled - much like their brothers in the group Switch. El DeBarge was zero tolerance when it came to drug use, and as such, Motown solely relied on him to complete the album. The drug use overpowered the remaining members of the group so much that El threatened to attempt a solo career on the Vandross tour. Motown then handed El the task of recording and finishing Rhythm of the Night with little to no input from his siblings. Most of the backing vocals were performed by El with an array of session vocalists. James DeBarge mentioned that he had no idea where the studios were to record his vocals and the only song he actually sang on was the title track, while Bunny was asked to sing over the background singers' parts.

When the album was released in early 1985, the label made it obvious about the future of the group. El's picture was enlarged while the other members' photos were downsized. Also, on the singles released from the album, the group was billed as El DeBarge with DeBarge. Despite the success of the album, Motown released the group from their recording contract and offered solo deals to El, Bunny and the youngest member of the DeBarge family, Chico. After modest sales of all three solo efforts, Motown dropped Bunny and Chico, while El left Motown for Warner Bros. Records.

Singles 
DeBarge gained airplay on MTV, VH1 and BET with the release of their single "Rhythm of the Night". The song reached #1 on the R&B chart and #3 on the Billboard Hot 100. The song is said to have been what jump started the career of songwriter Diane Warren and was the biggest hit recorded by the Motown family singing group. The single was certified gold. This hit single also made its appearance in the 80's film Berry Gordy’s The Last Dragon.

The second single "Who's Holding Donna Now" would become the group's second most successful single. The song reached #6 on the Billboard Hot 100 and #2 on the R&B chart. The single was certified gold.

The third single "You Wear It Well" was a moderate hit for DeBarge, reaching #46 on the Billboard Hot 100 and #7 on the R&B chart. This song also went to #1 on the Billboard Hot Dance Club Play chart.

The fourth and final single was the ballad "The Heart Is Not So Smart", which was another moderate hit for the group. It reached #75 on the Pop chart and #29 on the R&B chart. It still gains occasional airplay on radio stations in the U.S.

Track listing
"Prime Time" (Clif Magness, Glen Ballard, Jay Graydon) - 4:27
"The Heart Is Not So Smart" (Diane Warren) - 4:36
"Who's Holding Donna Now" (David Foster, Jay Graydon, Randy Goodrum) - 4:27
"Give It Up" (Jay Graydon, Randy Goodrum, Tom Canning) - 4:19
"Single Heart" (Giorgio Moroder, Pete Bellotte) - 3:33
"You Wear It Well" (Chico DeBarge,  El DeBarge) - 4:45
"The Walls (Came Tumbling Down)" (El DeBarge, Tony Redic) - 6:45
"Share My World" (Bobby DeBarge, Bunny DeBarge, El DeBarge) - 5:36
"Rhythm of the Night" (Diane Warren) - 3:49

Personnel 

DeBarge
 El DeBarge – lead vocals (1–3, 5–9), keyboards (6–8), synthesizer programming (6), drums (6, 7), percussion (6, 7), arrangements (6, 7), rhythm arrangements (8), backing vocals 
 Bunny DeBarge – backing vocals, lead vocals (5, 8)
 Mark DeBarge – backing vocals, lead vocals (4), percussion (6)
 James DeBarge – backing vocals 
 Randy DeBarge – backing vocals 

Additional personnel
 Glen Ballard – synthesizers (1), arrangements (1)
 Jay Graydon – synthesizers (1, 3, 4), arrangements (1-4), guitars (2, 4)
 Clif Magness – synthesizers (1), arrangements (1)
 Steven George – synthesizers (2), arrangements (2), backing vocals (3)
 Michael Omartian – synthesizers (2)
 Marcus Ryle – synthesizers (2), synthesizer programming (7), synthesizer sequencing (7)
 Robbie Buchanan – synthesizers (3, 4)
 David Foster – electric piano (3), synthesizers (3), arrangements (3)
 Steve Porcaro – synthesizers (3)
 Giorgio Moroder – synthesizers (5), synthesizer programming (5), arrangements (5)
 Paul Fox – synthesizer programming (6, 7)
 Mike Hightower – synthesizer sequencing (7)
 Jeff Lorber – synthesizers (9)
 Steve Mitchell – additional synthesizer (9)
 Howie Rice – additional synthesizer (9)
 Jesse Johnson – guitars (6)
 Paul Jackson, Jr. – guitars (7, 9)
 Dann Huff – guitars (9)
 Abraham Laboriel – bass (2, 3, 9)
 Nathan East – bass (4)
 Tommy DeBarge – bass (6)
 James Jamerson, Jr. – bass (8)
 Tyrone B. Feedback – drums (1, 2, 4)
 Carlos Vega – drums (3)
 Paulinho da Costa – drums (7), percussion (7, 9)
 Ricky Lawson – drums (8)
 John Robinson – drums (9)
 John Keane – percussion (1, 2)
 Mike Baird – percussion (4)
 Andy Narell – steel drums (2)
 David Boruff – saxophone (4)
 Benjamin Wright – string arrangements (8)
 Bill Champlin – backing vocals (1)
 Venette Gloud – backing vocals (1)
 Richard Page – backing vocals (3)
 Jim Gilstrap – backing vocals (6, 7)
 Bunny Hull – backing vocals (6, 7)

Production 
 Jay Graydon – producer (1-4), engineer (1-4)
 Giorgio Moroder – producer (5)
 El DeBarge – producer (6, 7), co-producer (8), mixing (6, 7)
 Bobby DeBarge – producer (8)
 Bunny DeBarge – co-producer (8)
 Richard Perry – producer (9)
 Ian Eales – engineer (1-4)
 Barney Perkins – recording (6, 7, 8), mixing (6, 7, 8), remixing (9)
 Steve Hodge – additional overdub recording (6, 7), mixing (6)
 Don Smith – rhythm and vocal track engineer (9)
 Michael Brooks – overdub recording (9)
 Glen Holguin – assistant engineer (9)
 Alex Schmoll – assistant engineer (9)
 Jim Scott – assistant engineer (9)
 Steve Hall – mastering 
 Bradford Rosenberger – production coordinator (9)
 Benny Medina – project coordinator 
 Gail Pierson – project coordinator
 Johnny Lee – art direction 
 Janet Levinson – design 
 Bobby Holland – photography
 Tony Jones – management 

Studios
 Recorded at Garden Rake Studios (Sherman Oaks, CA); Yamaha Research & Development Studio (Glendale, CA); Larrabee Sound Studios (North Hollywood, CA); Hollywood Sound Recorders (Hollywood, CA); Record Plant and Studio 55 (Los Angeles, CA).
 Mixed at Garden Rake Studios and Studio 55.
 Mastered at Future Disc (Hollywood, CA).

Charts

Weekly charts

Certifications

References

1985 albums
DeBarge albums
Albums produced by Giorgio Moroder
Albums produced by Richard Perry
Gordy Records albums